Nedrow  is a hamlet (and census-designated place) located in the town of Onondaga in Onondaga County, New York, United States. The population was 2,244 at the 2010 census. It is a suburb of Syracuse, whose southern border it adjoins.

The name "Nedrow" is the founder's name Worden, spelled backwards.

Geography
Nedrow is located at  (42.977666, -76.143764), on U.S. Route 11, south of Syracuse. Interstate 81 passes through the community.

Demographics

As of the census of 2000, there were 2,265 people, 868 households, and 604 families residing in the community. The population density was 2,323.0 per square mile (892.4/km2). There were 916 housing units at an average density of 939.4/sq mi (360.9/km2). The racial makeup of the CDP was 83.49% White, 7.06% African American, 5.96% Native American, 0.22% Asian, 0.26% from other races, and 3.00% from two or more races. Hispanic or Latino of any race were 1.50% of the population.

There were 868 households, out of which 33.1% had children under the age of 18 living with them, 49.2% were married couples living together, 15.2% had a female householder with no husband present, and 30.4% were non-families. 24.9% of all households were made up of individuals, and 12.6% had someone living alone who was 65 years of age or older. The average household size was 2.61 and the average family size was 3.10.

In the CDP, the population was spread out, with 27.5% under the age of 18, 5.7% from 18 to 24, 29.3% from 25 to 44, 22.0% from 45 to 64, and 15.5% who were 65 years of age or older. The median age was 38 years. For every 100 females, there were 93.8 males. For every 100 females age 18 and over, there were 85.0 males.

The median income for a household in the CDP was $39,423, and the median income for a family was $43,491. Males had a median income of $31,518 versus $21,523 for females. The per capita income for the CDP was $19,470. About 1.7% of families and 4.2% of the population were below the poverty line, including 0.9% of those under age 18 and 10.5% of those age 65 or over.

Notable People
 Jerome Thompson (b. 1988), professional box lacrosse player
 Lyle Thompson (b. 1992), professional lacrosse player
 Miles Thompson (b. 1990), professional lacrosse player
 Mike Hart (b. 1986), professional football NFL player
 Latavius Murray (b. 1990), professional football NFL player

References

Hamlets in New York (state)
Census-designated places in New York (state)
Syracuse metropolitan area
Census-designated places in Onondaga County, New York
Hamlets in Onondaga County, New York